A department store is a retail establishment offering a wide range of consumer goods in different areas of the store, each area ("department") specializing in a product category.  In modern major cities, the department store made a dramatic appearance in the middle of the 19th century, and permanently reshaped shopping habits, and the definition of service and luxury. Similar developments were under way in London (with Whiteleys), in Paris (Le Bon Marché) and in New York (Stewart's).

Today, departments often include the following: clothing, cosmetics, do it yourself, furniture, gardening, hardware, home appliances, houseware, paint, sporting goods, toiletries, and  toys. Additionally, other lines of products such as food, books, jewellery, electronics, stationery, photographic equipment, baby products, and products for pets are sometimes included. Customers generally check out near the front of the store in discount department stores, while high-end traditional department stores include sales counters within each department. Some stores are one of many within a larger retail chain, while others are independent retailers.

Since the 1980s, they have come under heavy pressure from discounters, and have come under even heavier pressure from e-commerce sites since the 2000s.

Types

Department stores can be classified in several ways:
 Mainline department store or simply, the traditional department store, offering mid- to high-end goods, most or at least some of the time at the full retail price. Examples are Macy's, Bloomingdale's, J.C. Penney, Montgomery Ward, Sears and Belk.
Junior department store, a term used principally in the second part of the 20th century for a smaller version of a mainline department store. These were usually either independent stores, or chains that specialized in cosmetics and wearing apparel and accessories, with few home goods. such as Boston Store and Harris & Frank
 Discount department store, a large discount store selling apparel and home furnishings at a discount, either selling overstock from mainline department stores, or merchandise especially made for the discount department store market. Examples are Nordstrom Rack, Saks Off 5th, Marshalls, Ross Dress for Less, and Kohl's.

Some sources may refer to the following types of stores as department stores, even they are not generally considered as such:
Hypermarkets (discount superstores with full grocery offerings, such as Target, Walmart and Carrefour)
Variety stores, also known in the U.S. as five and dimes

History

Origins in England, 1700s
One of the first department stores may have been Bennett's in Derby, first established as an ironmonger (hardware shop) in 1734. It still stands to this day, trading in the same building. However, the first reliably dated department store to be established, was Harding, Howell & Co., which opened in 1796 on Pall Mall, London. (The oldest department store chain may be Debenhams, which was established in 1778 and closed in 2021. It is the longest trading defunct British retailer.) An observer writing in Ackermann's Repository, a British periodical on contemporary taste and fashion, described the enterprise in 1809 as follows:

The house is one hundred and fifty feet in length from front to back, and of proportionate width. It is fitted up with great taste, and is divided by glazed partitions into four departments, for the various branches of the extensive business, which is there carried on. Immediately at the entrance is the first department, which is exclusively appropriated to the sale of furs and fans. The second contains articles of haberdashery of every description, silks, muslins, lace, gloves, &etc. In the third shop, on the right, you meet with a rich assortment of jewelry, ornamental articles in ormolu, French clocks, &etc.; and on the left, with all the different kinds of perfumery necessary for the toilette. The fourth is set apart for millinery and dresses; so that there is no article of female attire or decoration, but what may be here procured in the first style of elegance and fashion. This concern has been conducted for the last twelve years by the present proprietors who have spared neither trouble nor expense to ensure the establishment of a superiority over every other in Europe, and to render it perfectly unique in its kind.

This venture is described as having all of the basic characteristics of the department store; it was a public retail establishment offering a wide range of consumer goods in different departments. Jonathan Glancey for the BBC writes:

Harding, Howell & Co was focused on the needs and desires of fashionable women. Here, at last women were free to browse and shop, safely and decorously, away from home and from the company of men. These, for the main part, were newly affluent middle class women, their good fortune – and the department store itself – nurtured and shaped by the Industrial Revolution. This was transforming life in London and the length and breadth of Britain at a dizzying pace on the back of energetic free trade, fecund invention, steam and sail, and a seemingly inexhaustible supply of expendable cheap labour.

This pioneering shop was closed down in 1820 when the business partnership was dissolved. All the major high streets in British cities had flourishing department stores by the mid-or late nineteenth century.  Increasingly, women became the main customers. Kendals (formerly Kendal Milne & Faulkner) in Manchester lays claim to being one of the first department stores and is still known to many of its customers as Kendal's, despite its 2005 name change to House of Fraser. The Manchester institution dates back to 1836 but had been trading as Watts Bazaar since 1796. At its zenith the store had buildings on both sides of Deansgate linked by a subterranean passage "Kendals Arcade" and an art nouveau tiled food hall. The store was especially known for its emphasis on quality and style over low prices giving it the nickname "the Harrods of the North", although this was due in part to Harrods acquiring the store in 1919. Harrods of London can be traced back to 1834, though the current store was built between 1894 and 1905. Liberty & Co. gained popularity in the 1870s for selling Oriental goods. In 1889 Oscar Wilde wrote "Liberty's is the chosen resort of the artistic shopper".

Origins in Parisian magasins de nouveautés

The Paris department stores have roots in the magasin de nouveautés, or novelty store; the first, the Tapis Rouge, was created in 1784.  They flourished in the early 19th century. Balzac described their functioning in his novel César Birotteau.  In the 1840s, with the arrival of the railroads in Paris and the increased number of shoppers they brought, they grew in size, and began to have large plate glass display windows, fixed prices and price tags, and advertising in newspapers.

A novelty shop called Au Bon Marché had been founded in Paris in 1838 to sell items like lace, ribbons, sheets, mattresses, buttons, and umbrellas. Boucicaut was famous for his marketing innovations; a reading room for husbands while their wives shopped; extensive newspaper advertising; entertainment for children; and six million catalogs sent out to customers. By 1880 half the employees were women; unmarried women employees lived in dormitories on the upper floors.

Au Bon Marché soon had half a dozen or more competitors including Printemps, founded in 1865; La Samaritaine (1869), Bazaar de Hotel de Ville (BHV); and Galeries Lafayette (1895). The French gloried in the national prestige brought by the great Parisian stores. The great writer Émile Zola (1840–1902) set his novel Au Bonheur des Dames (1882–83) in the typical department store, making it a symbol of the new technology that was both improving society and devouring it.

First Australian department stores 
Australia is notable for having the longest continuously operating department store, David Jones. The first David Jones department store was opened on 24 May 1838, by Welsh born immigrant David Jones in a “large and commodious premises” on the corner of George and Barrack Streets in Sydney, NSW, only 50 years after the foundation of the colony. Expanding to a number of stores in the various states of Australia, David Jones is the oldest continuously operating department franchise in the world. Other department stores in Australia include Grace Brothers founded in 1885, now merged with Myer which was founded in 1900.

First American department stores (1825–1858)
Arnold Constable was the first American department store. It was founded in 1825 as a small dry goods store on Pine Street in New York City. In 1857 the store moved into a five-story white marble dry goods palace known as the Marble House. During the Civil War, Arnold Constable was one of the first stores to issue charge bills of credit to its customers each month instead of on a bi-annual basis.  The store soon outgrew the Marble House and erected a cast-iron building on Broadway and Nineteenth Street in 1869; this "Palace of Trade" expanded over the years until it was necessary to move into a larger space in 1914. Financial problems led to bankruptcy in 1975.

In New York City in 1846, Alexander Turney Stewart established the "Marble Palace" on Broadway, between Chambers and Reade streets. He offered European retail merchandise at fixed prices on a variety of dry goods, and advertised a policy of providing "free entrance" to all potential customers. Though it was clad in white marble to look like a Renaissance palazzo, the building's cast iron construction permitted large plate glass windows that permitted major seasonal displays, especially in the Christmas shopping season. In 1862, Stewart built a new store on a full city block uptown between 9th and 10th streets, with eight floors. His innovations included buying from manufacturers for cash and in large quantities, keeping his markup small and prices low, truthful presentation of merchandise, the one-price policy (so there was no haggling), simple merchandise returns and cash refund policy, selling for cash and not credit, buyers who searched worldwide for quality merchandise, departmentalization, vertical and horizontal integration, volume sales, and free services for customers such as waiting rooms and free delivery of purchases. In 1858, Rowland Hussey Macy founded Macy's as a dry goods store.

Innovations 1850–1917

Marshall Field & Company originated in 1852. It was the premier department store on the busiest shopping street in the Midwest at the time, State Street in Chicago. Marshall Field's served as a model for other department stores in that it had exceptional customer service. Marshall Field's also had the firsts; among many innovations by Marshall Field's were the first European buying office, which was located in Manchester, England, and the first bridal registry. The company was the first to introduce the concept of the personal shopper, and that service was provided without charge in every Field's store, until the chain's last days under the Marshall Field's name. It was the first store to offer revolving credit and the first department store to use escalators. Marshall Field's book department in the State Street store was legendary; it pioneered the concept of the "book signing". Moreover, every year at Christmas, Marshall Field's downtown store windows were filled with animated displays as part of the downtown shopping district display; the "theme" window displays became famous for their ingenuity and beauty, and visiting the Marshall Field's windows at Christmas became a tradition for Chicagoans and visitors alike, as popular a local practice as visiting the Walnut Room with its equally famous Christmas tree or meeting "under the clock" on State Street.

In 1877, John Wanamaker opened what some claim was the United States' first "modern" department store in Philadelphia: the first to offer fixed prices marked on every article and also introduced electrical illumination (1878), the telephone (1879), and the use of pneumatic tubes to transport cash and documents (1880) to the department store business.

Another store to revolutionize the concept of the department store was Selfridges in London, established in 1909 by American-born Harry Gordon Selfridge on Oxford Street. The company's innovative marketing promoted the radical notion of shopping for pleasure rather than necessity and its techniques were adopted by modern department stores the world over. The store was extensively promoted through paid advertising. The shop floors were structured so that goods could be made more accessible to customers. There were elegant restaurants with modest prices, a library, reading and writing rooms, special reception rooms for French, German, American and "Colonial" customers, a First Aid Room, and a Silence Room, with soft lights, deep chairs, and double-glazing, all intended to keep customers in the store as long as possible. Staff members were taught to be on hand to assist customers, but not too aggressively, and to sell the merchandise. Selfridge attracted shoppers with educational and scientific exhibits; in 1909, Louis Blériot's monoplane was exhibited at Selfridges (Blériot was the first to fly over the English Channel), and the first public demonstration of television by John Logie Baird took place in the department store in 1925.

In Japan, the first "modern-style" department store  was Mitsukoshi, founded in 1904, which has its root as a kimono store called Echigoya from 1673. When the roots are considered, however, Matsuzakaya has an even longer history, dated from 1611. The kimono store changed to a department store in 1910. In 1924, Matsuzakaya store in Ginza allowed street shoes to be worn indoors, something innovative at the time. These former kimono shop department stores dominated the market in its earlier history. They sold, or instead displayed, luxurious products, which contributed to their sophisticated atmospheres. Another origin of the Japanese department store is from railway companies. There have been many private railway operators in the nation and, from the 1920s, they started to build department stores directly linked to their lines' termini. Seibu and Hankyu are typical examples of this type.

Innovation (1917–1945)
In the middle of the 1920s, American management theories such as the scientific management of F.W. Taylor started spreading in Europe. The International Management Institute (I.M.I.) was established in Geneva in 1927 to facilitate the diffusion of such ideas. A number of department stores teamed up together to create the International Association of Department Stores in Paris in 1928 to have a discussion space dedicated to this retail format.

Expansion to malls
The U.S. Baby boom led to the development of suburban neighborhoods and suburban commercial developments, including shopping malls. Department stores joined these ventures following the growing market of baby boomer spending.

Expansion worldwide

Current situation

Around the world

See also
 Department stores around the world
 List of department stores by country
 Distribution, Retail, Marketing
 History of retailing in the modern era
 Types of retail outlets
International Association of Department Stores

References

Further reading

 Abelson, Elaine S. When Ladies Go A-Thieving: Middle Class Shoplifters in the Victorian Department Store. New York: Oxford University Press, 1989.
 
 Barth, Gunther. "The Department Store," in City People: The Rise of Modern City Culture in Nineteenth-Century America. (Oxford University Press, 1980) pp 110–47, compares major countries in the 19th century.
 Benson, Susan Porter. Counter Culture: Saleswomen, Managers and Customers in American Department Stores, 1890–1940. (University of Illinois Press, 1988) .
 Elias, Stephen N. Alexander T. Stewart: The Forgotten Merchant Prince (1992) online
 Ershkowicz, Herbert. John Wanamaker, Philadelphia Merchant. New York: DaCapo Press, 1999.
 Gibbons, Herbert Adams. John Wanamaker. New York: Harper & Row, 1926.
 Hendrickson, Robert. The Grand Emporiums: The Illustrated History of America's Great Department Stores. (Stein and Day, 1979).
 Leach, William.  Land of Desire: Merchants, Power, and the Rise of a New American Culture. (Pantheon, 1993. ).
 Parker, K. (2003). "Sign Consumption in the 19th-Century Department Store: An Examination of Visual Merchandising in the Grand Emporiums (1846–1900)." Journal of Sociology 39 (4): 353–371.
 Parker, Traci. Department Stores and the Black Freedom Movement: Workers, Consumers, and Civil Rights from the 1930s to the 1980s. Chapel Hill: University of North Carolina Press, 2019.
 Schlereth, Thomas J. Victorian America: Transformations in Everyday Life, 1876–1915. (HarperCollins, 1991).
 Sobel, Robert. "John Wanamaker: The Triumph of Content Over Form," in The Entrepreneurs: Explorations Within the American Business Tradition (Weybright & Talley, 1974. ).
 Spang, Rebecca L. The Invention of the Restaurant: Paris and Modern Gastronomic Culture. (Harvard UP, 2000). 325 p.
 Tiersten, Lisa. Marianne in the Market: Envisioning Consumer Society in Fin-de-Siècle France (2001) online
 Whitaker, Jan Service and Style: How the American Department Store Fashioned the Middle Class. (St. Martin's Press, 2006. .)
 Whitaker, Jan. The World of Department Stores (The Vedome Press, 2011).
 Young, William H. "Department Store" in Encyclopedia of American Studies, ed. Simon J. Bronner (Johns Hopkins UP, 2015), online

External links 

 The rise of the department store in Britain
 A.T. Stewart's
  (292 KiB)
 International Association of Department Stores
 New York Journal. Under One Roof The death and life of the New York department store. by Adam Gopnik

 
Retail formats